Daddy-O is a 1958 B-movie starring Dick Contino, Sandra Giles and Bruno VeSota. It was directed by Lou Place and written by David Moessinger. The film is notable for its soundtrack as being the debut film score for John Williams. The film was released by American International Pictures as a double feature with Roadracers. It was later featured as a movie mocked by Mystery Science Theater 3000. Daddy-O was produced by Elmer C. Rhoden Jr. who also produced The Delinquents (1957) and The Cool and the Crazy (1958).

Plot
Hotshot street-racer Phil Sandifer (Contino) is working as a truck driver when he is harassed by a sports car driving on the highway. He later meets up with the driver, Jana (Giles), in a local club. Jana challenges Phil to a race; Jana runs Phil off the road, and he loses. At the same time, his best friend Sonny is run off the road and killed by an unidentified assailant (VeSota).

Later at the club, Phil is arrested for destruction of city property and trespassing in the area they raced through, reckless driving, and hit-and-run and manslaughter for Sonny's death. The hit-and-run and manslaughter charges are dropped but Phil is found guilty of the other three charges - as a result, Phil is placed on probation and is stripped of his driver's license. Phil quickly launches into an investigation into Sonny's murder, his first suspect being Jana. She denies any involvement, and joins Phil in his investigation. He follows the trail of clues to nightclub owner Sidney Chillas (Sonny's assailant), and Chillas's lackey Bruce, who runs the gym Sonny used to frequent. Chillas hires Phil as a singer under the alias of "Daddy-O".

Not long after being hired, Phil is beaten up by a couple of drug dealers who have mistaken him for Pete Plum, a pseudonym used by Sonny. Phil draws the conclusion that Sonny had been moving money around for Chillas, and that he had stolen some of the money and was killed as a result. Phil confronts Chillas with the information, and they confront one another in a liquor cellar. Phil manages to knock Chillas out, and soon the police arrive and arrest him and Bruce. The movie ends just as Phil is asked to sing.

Cast

Phil Sandifer/Daddy-O: Dick Contino
Jana Ryan: Sandra Giles
Sidney Chillas: Bruno VeSoto
Marcia Hayes: Gloria Victor
Duke Manion: Ron McNeil
Bruce Green: Jack McClure
Peg Lawrence: Sonia Torgeson
Ken: Kelly Gordon
Barney: Hank Mann
Frank Wooster: Joseph Donte
Kerm: Joseph Martin
Sonny DiMarco: Bob Banas

Release and reception
The film was released by AIP on a double bill with Roadracers.

Mystery Science Theater 3000
The film was featured in Episode 307 of the television series Mystery Science Theater 3000, paired with the short subject Alphabet Antics. The episode also features a parody of the film's song "Rock Candy Baby", with Joel Robinson, Crow T. Robot and Tom Servo performing the tune as "Hike Your Pants Up".

The episode was part of the Mystery Science Theater 3000 Volume XXXIII DVD box set, released by Shout! Factory in July 2015. The other episodes in the four-disc set include Earth vs. the Spider (episode #313), Teen-Age Crime Wave (episode #522), and Agent for H.A.R.M. (episode #815).

In other media
 In the 1994 hit film Pulp Fiction, a poster for Daddy-O is visible during scenes taking place in the 1950s nostalgia restaurant "Jack Rabbit Slim's".
 In 1994 author James Ellroy wrote Hollywood Nocturnes, a collection of short stories, one of which was titled Dick Contino's Blues, a fictional take on the making of the film and surrounding back story starring Dick Contino.

See also
 List of American films of 1958
 Traditional pop
 The Beatniks - 1960 film similar in content and also spoofed on MST3K

References

External links
 
 
 

1958 films
American auto racing films
American crime drama films
American International Pictures films
American black-and-white films
1958 crime drama films
Films scored by John Williams
1950s English-language films
Teensploitation
1950s American films